John Worsdale (29 October 1948 – 22 September 2017) was a footballer who played in the Football League for Lincoln City and Stoke City.

Career
Worsdale started his career at his local club Stoke City after coming through the youth ranks at the Victoria Ground. He made his professional debut for Stoke in an away match against Arsenal in September 1968. He made just three more appearances for the "Potters" during the 1968–69 season before being released at the end of it. He joined Lincoln City and spent four years with the "Imps" making 67 league appearances and scoring nine goals before dropping into non-league football with Worksop Town.

Career statistics

References

External links
 

1948 births
2017 deaths
Footballers from Stoke-on-Trent
English footballers
Association football wingers
Stoke City F.C. players
Lincoln City F.C. players
Worksop Town F.C. players
English Football League players